Hanshill, also known as Rough House, Camp Suhling, and Camp Merry Minglers, is a historic summer home and camp located near Madison Heights, Amherst County, Virginia.  The property was developed by the Suhling family.  Rough House dates to about 1880 and is a log cabin with a gable roof.  It was named Rough House as early as 1918, and a series of additions were added about 1935.  Associated with Rough House are a contributing corn crib (c. 1940) and Y.W.C.A. Spring Box (c. 1918).  Hanshill was built in 1925, and is a -story, frame dwelling on a concrete foundation in a Rustic Revival style.  It features a full-length, one-story, four-bay porch. Associated with Hanshill are servant's quarters (c. 1927), a garage / bunkhouse (c. 1927), and an outdoor tennis court (c. 1915).  From 1918 to 1922, the property hosted the first semi-permanent summer camp for white girls organized by the Young Women's Christian Association (Y.W.C.A.) of Lynchburg.

It was added to the National Register of Historic Places in 2011.

References

Houses in Amherst County, Virginia
Houses completed in 1925
Houses on the National Register of Historic Places in Virginia
National Register of Historic Places in Amherst County, Virginia